Chatsworth Township is located in Livingston County, Illinois. As of the 2010 census, its population was 1,366 and it contained 639 housing units.

History
Chatsworth Township changed its name from Olivers Grove Township on October 11, 1859.

Chatsworth Township was named after the Chatsworth House, the country home of the Duke of Devonshire, England.

Geography

Demographics

References

External links
US Census
City-data.com
Illinois State Archives

Townships in Livingston County, Illinois
Populated places established in 1857
Townships in Illinois
1857 establishments in Illinois